Boris Abalyan (born October 28, 1947) is a Russian choir conductor. He founded the Lege Artis Chamber Choir in 1987 and is its chief conductor.

References

1947 births
Living people
Russian choral conductors
21st-century Russian conductors (music)
Russian male conductors (music)
21st-century Russian male musicians
Place of birth missing (living people)